Readhimer is an unincorporated community in Natchitoches Parish, Louisiana, United States.

The community is part of the Natchitoches Micropolitan Statistical Area. It is located within the Chestnut-Readhimer Water System. Readhimer is east of Ashland and northwest of Goldonna.

Notable people
Roy Sanders

References 

Unincorporated communities in Natchitoches Parish, Louisiana
Populated places in Ark-La-Tex
Unincorporated communities in Louisiana